The Leamington Lift Bridge is a lift bridge that crosses the Union Canal near its terminus at Lochrin Basin in Edinburgh.

History
The bridge was installed around 1906 where Fountainbridge crossed the canal replacing a previous bridge built in 1869. When the canal was shortened in 1922 to make Lochrin Basin the terminus it was moved to its present site to replace a wooden drawbridge. It fell out of use by the 1960s, but as part of the Millennium Link project to restore the Union Canal, it required to be restored at least to allow boats to pass. A report published in the year 2000 had suggested fixing it permanently open, but the decision was taken to restore it to full working order.

The restoration involved removing the deck and the top member of the bridge to access the inner workings. It opened for the first time on 16 May 2002, followed by an official opening ceremony on 24 May.

In July 2021, a Red Wheel plaque was unveiled at the bridge. Red Wheel plaques are installed by the National Transport Trust to identify sites of significant transport heritage. The one at the bridge is the first to be awarded on a Scottish canal.

Design

The bridge crosses between Gilmore Park and Leamington Road, but is not open to cars. A permanent lattice girder footbridge allows pedestrians to cross when the deck is raised.

It is formed from riveted steel, with more substantial columns on the southern side where the motors and counterbalances are housed.

The bridge can be opened by canal users after appropriate training from Scottish Canals. It is only the width of a single canal boat.

References

Bridges in Edinburgh
Category B listed buildings in Edinburgh
Listed bridges in Scotland
Bridges completed in 1906
1906 establishments in Scotland
Vertical lift bridges in the United Kingdom